"In This World" is a song by American electronica musician Moby. It was released as the third single from his sixth studio album 18 on November 4, 2002. It peaked at number 35 on the UK Singles Chart. The song incorporates prominent vocal samples from "Lord Don't Leave Me" by The Davis Sisters.

Music video 
The music video for "In This World", directed by Style Wars, features aliens from a small asteroid, who are planning a mission to the Earth bringing customary Earth greetings, including "Hello", "Hi", and "Hola". Three aliens and their dog-like creature then board a flying saucer en route to Earth. They land, and quickly realize that the people, inhabitants of New York, are much larger than they had expected—so large in fact that the aliens go unnoticed, despite their best efforts. At the end of the video, a man (played by Moby) notices them, but walks away. They then go back to their home planet, and make a giant sign, bearing the word "Hello".

The music video for the song "Sunday (The Day Before My Birthday)" acts as the sequel to the story.

Track listings 
 CD single 
 "In This World" – 3:26
 "Piano & Strings" – 5:16
 "Downhill" – 5:18
 CD single – remixes 
 "In This World"  – 2:59
 "In This World"  – 7:40
 "In This World"  – 7:59
 12-inch single 
 "In This World"  – 7:40
 "In This World"  – 11:55

Charts

Release history

References

External links 
 

2002 singles
2002 songs
Moby songs
Mute Records singles
Songs written by Moby
Number-one singles in Poland